The 1955 Clemson Tigers football team was an American football team that represented Clemson College in the Atlantic Coast Conference (ACC) during the 1955 college football season. In its 16th season under head coach Frank Howard, the team compiled a 7–3 record (3–1 against conference opponents), finished third in the ACC, and outscored opponents by a total of 206 to 144. The team played its home games at Memorial Stadium in Clemson, South Carolina.

Quarterback Don King was the team captain. The team's statistical leaders included Don King with 586 passing yards, halfback Joel Wells with 782 rushing yards, and halfback Joe Pagliei with 43 points (7 touchdowns, 1 extra point).

Joel Wells was selected by both the Associated Press and United Press as a first-team player on the 1955 All-Atlantic Coast Conference football team. Six Clemson players were also named to the 1955 All-South Carolina football team: Wells, back Billy O'Dell, end Willie Smith, tackle Dick Marazza, guard John Grdijan, and center Wingo Avery.

Schedule

References

Clemson
Clemson Tigers football seasons
Clemson Tigers football